Carbohydrate sulfotransferase 6 is an enzyme that in humans is encoded by the CHST6 gene.

It codes for an enzyme necessary for the production of keratan sulfate. Mutations in the gene lead to macular corneal dystrophy.

References

External links

Further reading